Rakitec is a village in the municipality of Konče, North Macedonia.

Demographics
According to the 2002 census, the village had a total of 519 inhabitants. Ethnic groups in the village include:

Macedonians 519

References

Villages in Konče Municipality